The Shivalik class or Project 17 class is a class of multi-role stealth frigates in service with the Indian Navy. They are the first stealth warships built in India. They were designed to have better stealth features and land-attack capabilities than the preceding s. A total of three ships were built between 2000 and 2010, and all three were in commission by 2012.

The Shivalik class, along with the seven Project 17A frigates currently being developed from them, are projected be the principal frigates of the Indian Navy in the first half of the 21st century. All ships of the class were built by Mazagon Dock Limited. The class and the lead vessel have been named for the Shivalik hills. Subsequent vessels in the class are also named for hill-ranges in India.

Design and description
Project 17 was conceived in the 1990s to meet the Indian Navy's need for a class of stealthy frigates that were to be designed and built in India. The Directorate of Naval Design (DND)'s specifications for the project called for a class of "5000 ton stealth frigates (Project 17) incorporating advanced signature suppression and signature management features". The first three units were formally ordered by the Indian Navy in early 1999.

Shivaliks design embodies many firsts in Indian ships. Shivalik is the first Indian naval vessel to use a combined diesel or gas (CODOG) propulsion system. The CODOG gearboxes were designed and built by Elecon Engineering.

The main features of the class are its stealth characteristics and land-attack capability. The ships incorporate structural, thermal and acoustic stealth features. The vessels use 10 gigabit LAN for their network.

There has also been an increased emphasis on crew comfort in this class of ships with more spacious accommodation being provided. Also, INS Shivalik is the first ship in the Indian Navy with chapati- and dosa-makers on board.

General characteristics and propulsion

The complement is about 257, including 35 officers.

Electronics and sensors
The Shivalik-class frigates are equipped with a wide range of electronics and sensors. These include:
 1 × MR-760 Fregat M2EM 3-D radar
 4 × MR-90 Orekh radars
 1 × ELTA EL/M-2238 STAR
 2 × ELTA EL/M-2221 STGR
 1 × BEL APARNA
In addition, the ships use HUMSA-NG (hull-mounted sonar array) and the BEL Ellora Electronic Warfare suite.

Armament
The Shivalik-class frigates are equipped with a mix of Russian, Indian and Israeli weapon systems. These include the 76mm Otobreda naval gun, Klub and BrahMos supersonic anti-ship missiles, Shtil-1 anti-aircraft missiles, RBU-6000 anti-submarine rocket launchers and 6–324 mm ILAS 3 (2 triple)torpedoes. A 32 cell VLS launched Barak SAM and AK-630 act as Close-in weapon systems (CIWS). The ships also carry two HAL Dhruv or Sea King Mk. 42B helicopters.

Construction and service
All the three ships of the class were constructed at the Mazagon Dock Limited. The construction of the lead ship, Shivalik, commenced in December 2000. The ship's keel was laid in July 2001 and was launched in April 2003. It underwent sea trials in February 2009 before being commissioned in April 2010. The second ship, Satpura, was laid in October 2002. It was launched in June 2004 and commissioned in August 2011. The third and final ship, Sahyadri, was laid in September 2003, launched in May 2005 and commissioned in July 2012. All the three ships are named after hill-ranges in India: Shivalik after the Sivalik Hills, Satpura after the Satpura range and Sahyadri after the Sahyadri range commonly called Western Ghats.

The Japanese Maritime Self-Defence Force (JMSDF) was represented by two destroyers, one maritime patrol aircraft and a helicopter. After the deployment in the north Pacific, the battle group was deployed in the South China Sea. As part of India's Look East policy, the ships visited the Shanghai port on 13 June 2012, for a five-day goodwill tour. INS Shakti served as the fuel and logistics tanker to the three destroyers. The ships left the port on 17 June 2012. Before leaving the port, the ships conducted a routine passage exercise with the People's Liberation Army Navy.

The other ships which participated in the exercise included Carrier Strike Group (CSG) 1 of the US Navy, consisting of: , embarked Carrier Air Wing (CVW) 17, the  guided-missile cruiser  and the  guided-missile destroyer . Military Sealift Command's fast combat support ship  also provided support for the exercise.

INS Shivalik participated in the PLAN's 65th anniversary celebrations held in Qingdao sailing 4,500 miles from Port Blair without any assistance from support ships. India, Indonesia and China conducted three high level exercises including anti-hijack exercise.

Ships

Gallery

See also
 Ships of the Indian Navy
 List of naval ship classes in service
 
 Indian Naval Air Arm
 INS Shivalik (F47)

References

External links

 Image of INS Shivalik launch
 Novenco Pdf document 
 Global Security – Shivalik Class Frigates
 Rediff – Why Shivalik-class frigates matter to India

 
Frigate classes
Ships built in India
Stealth ships